Renous may refer to:

 Renous, New Brunswick, a rural community in New Brunswick
 Renous River, a river in New Brunswick